A cargo net is a type of net. It is usually square or rectangle, but sometimes round, made of thick rope, with cinch ropes extending from the corners, and in some designs, the edges. It is named for its use in transferring cargo to and from ships.

Uses

Cargo transfer
 
In shipping, cargo lift nets are used to load and unload cargo. The net is spread out by stevedores, who load the goods onto it. They then attach the cinches to a crane hook. Lifting the hook draws the corners of the net around the cargo. This results in a balanced and secure load which can be safely hoisted. Goods are transferred from one place to another in the construction industry using cargo nets. When used to transfer cargo by helicopter, they are referred to as "underslung" cargo nets.

Securing loads
Cargo nets are used by the military, and in the shipping industry, to secure loads to prevent them from shifting during transport, as well as to deter theft.

Obstacle courses

As part of obstacle courses, cargo nets are used as flexible ladders. This originated with landing nets used by amphibious assault troops to board landing craft in the water alongside the ship. The troops climbed down the nets hung over the ship's side and boarded the bobbing landing craft.

Playgrounds
Although still used in playgrounds around the world, cargo nets have been subject to criticism due to the hazard of strangulation. The U.S. Consumer Product Safety Commission has issued a notice expressing concern that a child's head can become trapped if the openings are of a particular size.

Marine rescue and ship embarkation
In maritime situations, cargo nets can be slung over the side of a ship to allow passengers stranded in the water to climb aboard to safety. Cargo nets can also be used to transfer troops from a ship to landing craft.

Safety barriers
Especially on ships, cargo nets are used as physical barriers, to prevent individuals from falling through openings or overboard into the sea.

See also
Material handling equipment

References

Nets (devices)
Industrial equipment